List of MPs elected in the 1761 British general election

This is a list of the 558 MPs or Members of Parliament elected to the 314 constituencies of the Parliament of Great Britain in 1761, the 12th Parliament of Great Britain and their replacements returned at subsequent by-elections, arranged by constituency.



By-elections 
List of Great Britain by-elections (1754–74)

See also 
1761 British general election
List of parliaments of Great Britain
Unreformed House of Commons

References 

 The House of Commons 1754–1790, by Sir Lewis Namier and John Brooke (HMSO 1964)

External links 
 History of Parliament: Members 1754–1790
 History of Parliament: Constituencies 1754–1790

1761
1761
1761 in Great Britain
Lists of Members of the Parliament of Great Britain